Antonio Ghiardello (21 April 1898 – 4 January 1992) was an Italian rower who competed in the 1932 Summer Olympics and in the 1936 Summer Olympics.

Ghiardello missed the Italian trials in 1928 due to appendicitis and could therefore not qualify for the 1928 Summer Olympics. In 1932 he won the bronze medal as member of the Italian boat in the coxless four competition. Four years later he finished fourth as part of the Italian boat in the coxless four event.

References

External links
 
 

1898 births
1992 deaths
Italian male rowers
Olympic rowers of Italy
Rowers at the 1932 Summer Olympics
Rowers at the 1936 Summer Olympics
Olympic bronze medalists for Italy
Year of death unknown
Olympic medalists in rowing
Medalists at the 1932 Summer Olympics
European Rowing Championships medalists